Beaver Creek may refer to:

Places

Canada 
Beaver Creek, Yukon, a town in the western Yukon 
Beaver Creek, British Columbia, an unincorporated community on Vancouver Island
Beaver Creek Provincial Park, a park in the West Kootenay region of British Columbia
Beaver Creek Provincial Park (Manitoba), a park in Manitoba
Beaver Creek, Saskatchewan, a hamlet in Saskatchewan

United States 
Beaver Creek, Alabama
Beaver Creek, Colorado
Beaver Creek Resort, a ski area
Beaver Creek, Illinois
Allen, Kentucky, formerly known as Beaver Creek
Beaver Creek, Maryland
Beaver Creek, Minnesota
Beaver Creek, Montana
Beaver Creek, Ashe County, North Carolina
Beaver Creek, Texas
Beaver Creek Township, Michigan 
Beaver Creek Township, Minnesota

Waterways

United States

Alaska
Beaver Creek (Yukon River tributary), a 180-mile (290 km) tributary of the Yukon River in the U.S. state of Alaska
Beaver Creek (Kenai, Alaska), a tributary of the Kenai River

Idaho
Beaver Creek (Camas Creek), a tributary of Camas Creek in Idaho
Beaver Creek (Rock Creek), a tributary of Rock Creek in Idaho

Minnesota
Beaver Creek (Minnesota River), a stream in Minnesota
Beaver Creek (Split Rock Creek), a stream in Minnesota and South Dakota
Beaver Creek (Upper Iowa River), a stream in Minnesota

Missouri
Beaver Creek (White River tributary), a stream in Douglas and Taney counties of Missouri
Beaver Creek (Little Piney Creek), a stream in Phelps County Missouri
Beaver Creek (Gasconade River), a stream in Texas and Wright counties of southern Missouri

Nebraska
Beaver Creek (Niobrara River tributary), a stream in Holt County, Nebraska

New York
Beaver Creek (Tompkins County, New York), a tributary of Fall Creek
Beaver Creek (New York), a river in Madison and Oneida counties in New York. It flows into Unadilla River

North Carolina
Beaver Creek (New Hope River tributary), a stream in Chatham and Wake Counties, North Carolina
Beaver Creek (Reedy Fork tributary), a stream in Forsyth and Guilford Counties, North Carolina
Beaver Creek (Fisher River tributary), a stream in Surry County, North Carolina

Ohio
Beaver Creek (Raccoon Creek tributary), in Hocking County, Ohio
Beaver Creek (Lorain County, Ohio)
Beaver Creek (Mercer County, Ohio)

Pennsylvania
Beaver Creek (Pennsylvania), one of about fifteen (15) streams in Pennsylvania
Beaver Creek (Buttermilk Creek), a tributary of Buttermilk Creek in Lackawanna County and Wyoming County, in Pennsylvania
Beaver Creek (Lehigh River), a river in Pennsylvania 
Beaver Creek (Swatara Creek tributary), a tributary of the Swatara Creek in Hummelstown, Pennsylvania
Beaver Creek (Tinicum Creek), a tributary in Bucks County, Pennsylvania

Tennessee
Beaver Creek (Tennessee), a tributary of the Clinch River 
Beaver Creek (Piney River), Tennessee

Other states
Beaver Creek (Arizona), near Montezuma Castle National Monument
Beaver Creek (Colorado), a tributary of the South Platte River
Beaver Creek (Brandywine Creek tributary), a stream in New Castle County, Delaware
Beaver Creek (Kishwaukee River tributary), a tributary of the Kishwaukee River in Illinois
Beaver Creek (Polk County, Iowa), a tributary of the Des Moines River in Iowa
Beaver Creek (Kentucky)
Beaver Creek (Montana), a tributary of the Missouri River
Beaver Creek (Crooked River), a tributary of Crooked River in Oregon
Beaver Creek (Wichita River tributary), a river in Texas
Beaver Creek (Yellow River tributary), a stream in Wisconsin

Canada 
Beaver Creek (Alberta), a tributary of the Oldman River
Beaver Creek (Manitoba), one of nine creeks of that name in Manitoba
Beaver Creek (York Region), a tributary of the Rouge River in the Regional Municipality of York, Ontario

Other 
Beaver Creek (Pleasure Beach Blackpool), a children's amusement park inside Pleasure Beach Blackpool
Beaver Creek Camp, a Salvation Army camp in Saskatchewan, Canada
 the Beaver Creek meteorite of 1893, which fell in British Columbia, Canada (see Meteorite falls)
Beaver Creek Plantation, a former plantation in Henry County, Virginia
Beaver Creek State Natural Area, Oregon
Beaver Creek Falls (Lane County, Oregon), east of Florence, Oregon
Beaver Creek Massacre Site, Colorado
Beaver Creek State Park, Ohio
Beaver Creek Wilderness, Kentucky
Beaver Creek, a fictional television show produced by Pyramid Productions on Made in Canada

See also

Beavercreek (disambiguation)
Beaver Creek Township (disambiguation)
Little Beaver Creek (disambiguation)
Beaver Brook (disambiguation)
Beaver River (disambiguation)
Beaverdam Creek (disambiguation)